Phaeochoropsis is a genus of fungi within the family Phaeochoraceae.

Species
As accepted by Species Fungorum;
Phaeochoropsis diplothemiifolii 
Phaeochoropsis mucosa 
Phaeochoropsis neowashingtoniae 
Phaeochoropsis palmicola

References

External links 

Sordariomycetes genera
Phyllachorales